Joseph Herel (born 1953) is a Slovak football coach.

Herel played first division football in Czechoslovakia from 1970 to 1975.

He became a coach and went to Malaysia to work as the chief coach of the Malaysian first division from 1992 to 1995. He then spent a season as manager of a club in the Maldives in 1999.

From 2000 he worked as the chief coach of the Slovakian first division, until he was headhunted by the AFC to become Pakistan national football team head coach from January 2002 to March 2003.

External links
Herel comes to Pakistan

Expatriate football managers in Malaysia
Slovak expatriate sportspeople in Malaysia
Slovak expatriate sportspeople in Pakistan
Slovak expatriate football managers
Slovak footballers
Slovak football managers
Pakistan national football team managers
Perlis FA managers
1953 births
Living people
Association footballers not categorized by position